Suwon FC (Hanja: 水原 FC) is a South Korean professional football club based in Suwon, that competes in the K League 1, the South Korea's top professional league. They play their home games at Suwon Stadium.

History

Early years: semi-professional
Suwon city government decided to create a semi-professional level football club that would link school-level football clubs within the city and Suwon Samsung Bluewings, which is a professional club based in the city. On 15 March 2003, Suwon City Football Club was officially formed. The club appointed Kim Chang-kyum as their manager and joined the semi-professional Korea National League, which was then called the K2 League.

They won their first trophy in 2004 by winning the Korean President's Cup National Football Tournament. Slowly, they rose to strong contenders in the Korea National League as they reached the play-off on four occasions between 2005 and 2009, although they failed to lift the trophy on all four occasions. Finally, in the 2010 season, they became the league champions after beating Daejeon Korea Hydro & Nuclear Power 2–1 on aggregate in the final. Manager Kim Chang-kyum left the team after the 2010 season as his contract expired and Cho Deok-je, who had been managing the club's youth team, took over his place.

Suwon FC era
On 9 December 2012, it was officially announced that the team would become fully professional. The club's name was also changed to Suwon FC and got an approval to join the professional K League. Suwon FC joined the second-tier K League Challenge in the 2013 season. Their debut season as a professional club was successful, as they finished fourth in the league and became the only K League Challenge club to reach the quarter-finals in the FA Cup.

The 2015 season was a milestone for the club. After finishing the regular season in third place, Suwon FC proceeded to the K League Challenge play-offs in which they eliminated Seoul E-Land and Daegu FC. In the promotion-relegation playoffs, Suwon then defeated top division side Busan IPark 3–0 on aggregate and won the promotion to the 2016 K League Classic.

Current squad

Out on loan

Managers

Honours

League 
 K League 2
Runners-up (2): 2015, 2020

 National League
Winners (1): 2010
Runners-up (3): 2005, 2007, 2008

Cups 
 National League Championship
Winners (3): 2005, 2007, 2012
Runners-up (1): 2004
 National Sports Festival
Runners-up (3): 2006, 2007, 2011
 Gyeonggido Sports Festival
Winners (8): 2003, 2004, 2005, 2006, 2007, 2008, 2011, 2012
Runners-up (1): 2010
 President's Cup
Winners (2): 2004, 2007

Season-by-season record

See also
 List of football clubs in South Korea
 Suwon FC Women

References

External links

 Suwon FC Official website 

 
Korea National League clubs
K League 2 clubs
Sport in Suwon
Sport in Gyeonggi Province
Association football clubs established in 2003
2003 establishments in South Korea
K League 1 clubs